Windy Hill Open Space Preserve is a regional park located in San Mateo County, California and operated by the Midpeninsula Regional Open Space District (MROSD).  It is readily identifiable from the flatlands of the South Bay, as it is the only "naked" part of the peninsula range (not forested).

The Windy Hill Preserve comprises an important 1132 acre (4.6 km2) stretch of conservation land on the eastward side of the Peninsula Range (Santa Cruz Mountains), rising from the valley road near Portola Valley to the 1905 ft (581 m) summit from which it gets its name.  Access to the summit is easy (0.5 mile moderate grade) from State Route 35, the ridge road along the Peninsula Range.  Facilities focus on trails for hiking and mountain biking, with around 14 miles (22 km) of hiking trails.  Paragliding and hang gliding are permitted with a special use permit, and are popular activities in the winter months when there are East winds.  In clear weather there are magnificent views from the summit, and indeed the entire upper end of the park, across the campus of Stanford University to the San Francisco Bay and beyond to Mount Tamalpais and Mount Diablo. Downtown San Francisco is visible, as well as the Pacific Ocean.

Most of Windy Hill is sheltered from the prevailing weather, which comes in off of the Pacific Ocean. A nice day further down can be very cold, windy, foggy or rainy at the summit.

The area is rich in wildlife; among the species likely to be seen are California mule deer, coyote, California vole, white-tailed kite, American kestrel, band-tailed pigeon and California quail. There are signs warning about mountain lions, but  bobcats are more common. Rattlesnakes and gopher snakes may also be found. Banana slugs and, in season, California newts are common.

Spring Ridge Trail runs from the Portola Valley trailhead to Skyline Boulevard through the open, grassy part of the preserve. It, like most of the lower trails, is a fire road, open to cyclists as well as hikers and equestrians. Two trails further to the south (Hamms Gulch and the Lost Trail-Razorback Ridge-Eagle Trail combination), are single-tracks not open to cyclists. These trails run through forested country: oak, fir, buckeye, bay laurel, madrone and one or two redwoods.

Because the far shore rises so steeply, Sausal Pond appears to be black or murky green, rather than sky-blue. This marshy pond is home to a few coots and the occasional mallard, to dragonflies and bullfrogs. Shoreline access is limited to not more than one or two hundred feet, much of that surrounded by bush and accessible only to the determined.

Picture gallery

References

External links
MROSD official website about Windy Hill
Windy Hill at Bay Area Hiker
Summitpost - Windy Hill

Protected areas of San Mateo County, California
Regional parks in California
Bay Area Ridge Trail
1979 establishments in California
Protected areas established in 1979